Brad Terrence Jordan (born November 9, 1970), better known by his stage name Scarface, is an American rapper and record producer best known as a member of the Geto Boys, a hip-hop group from Houston, Texas. He grew up in Houston and is originally from the city's South Acres (Crestmont Park) neighborhood. In 2012, The Source ranked him #16 on their list of the Top 50 Lyricists of All Time, while About.com ranked him #6 on its list of the 50 Greatest MCs of Our Time (1987–2007).

Early life and education
Scarface attended Woodson Middle School in Houston, Texas. He dropped out of high school and worked as a drug dealer. As a teenager, he attempted suicide, and subsequently spent time in a hospital psychiatric ward.

He was brought up as a Christian, and converted to Islam in 2006.

Career
He began his career as DJ Akshen (pronounced “Action“), recording and deejaying for Lil' Troy's Short Stop, which was a local record label in Houston. After releasing the 12" single "Scarface/Another Head Put To Rest" (1989), which was written by Chris "Mr. 3-2" Barriere and produced by Def Jam Blaster and Bruce "Grim" Rhodes, he would go on to sign with Rap-A-Lot Records and join a group who were collectively known as the Geto Boys, replacing a member who left. The first Geto Boys album he appeared on was the group's second album, Grip It! On That Other Level (1989), a highly successful album that garnered the group a large fanbase. Radio and MTV refused to play any songs from the album because of their violent lyrics, but by the standards of the time, Geto Boys were a major success, and 2 Live Crew were the only Southern rap crew whose success was at all comparable.

Jordan took his stage name from the 1983 film Scarface, starring Al Pacino and directed by Brian De Palma.

In 1992, Scarface appeared (along with fellow Geto Boys member Bushwick Bill) on the Kool G Rap & DJ Polo album Live and Let Die. Kool G Rap was and remains as influential a figure in the development of East Coast hip-hop, especially mafioso rap, as Scarface was and remains in and to the history of Southern gangsta rap, which made the pairing especially notable. During this period of his career, Scarface also worked with the West Coast gangsta rap stars Ice Cube and MC Eiht and with his good friend Devin The Dude, a peaceable stoner rapper and fellow Rap-A-Lot signee.

Scarface’s 1991 solo album Mr. Scarface Is Back was a success, and his popularity soon caused him to overshadow the other Geto Boys. Scarface remained in the group, but he released a series of solo albums that kept him in the public eye, and they sold well. Scarface is the only Geto Boys member who has remained with the group ever since the lineup was revamped in 1989.

Scarface’s popularity as a solo artist peaked with the albums The Diary and The Last of a Dying Breed, the latter of which received positive reviews, sold well, earned him the title of “Lyricist of the Year” at the 2001 Source Awards.

In 2002, Scarface released The Fix, the follow-up to The Last of a Dying Breed. The Fix was one of the most acclaimed rap albums of its time, and featured an all-star ensemble cast including not only both Nas and Jay-Z (whose mutual presence on the album despite the fact that they were engaged in what was at that point the highest-profile rap beef in the history of hip-hop indicated just how widely and truly Scarface was respected in hip-hop culture, but also Faith Evans, Kelly Price, a very well-respected lieutenant of Ice Cube’s from the West Coast named WC, and the Philadelphia rapper Beanie Sigel, an affiliate of Jay-Z’s then-dominant Roc-A-Fella Records with whom Scarface had been good friends since at least 1998 and with whom there were perpetual rumours that Scarface would make a collaborative album.

It was around this time that Scarface also returned to the studio with the Geto Boys for what turned out to be their final album as a trio, The Foundation. Further, he was featured on The Biggie Duets alongside Big Gee and Akon, and he guested on Ray Cash's debut single "Bumpin' My Music".

In addition to his career as a rapper, Scarface was the coordinator and president of Def Jam South from 2000 to 2005, where he fostered the career of the rapper Ludacris, a transplant from Chicago to Atlanta.

Scarface has appeared on Freeway's album Free at Last and on Beanie Sigel's album, The Solution. Scarface has produced three tracks on UGK's Underground Kingz including "Life Is 2009", "Still Ridin' Dirty", and "Candy".

Some of Scarface's early music videos ("A Minute to Pray and a Second to Die") featured community activist Quanell X in supporting roles.

In 2008, Scarface collaborated with rapper Tech N9ne on his album Killer on the song "Pillow Talkin'".

Despite limited commercial appeal, he remains out of the norm and popular among those in the industry, and has been described as "your favorite rapper's favorite rapper". On August 6, 2009, Scarface performed at the 2009 Gathering of the Juggalos. In 2005, comedian Chris Rock praised Scarface as one of the best three rappers of all time on his list of the Top-25 Hip-Hop Albums ever.

On June 30, 2010, Scarface announced that he was working on a new album entitled The Habit, which would include features from John Legend and Drake, and that it was scheduled for release that fall. For one production on the album, Scarface co-hosted a worldwide producer showcase with iStandard from which thousands of producers were considered and after a selection of the top 8, Alex Kresovich was named winner. The album would feature a production from Eminem. In February 2011, news came that he had been held in jail without bail since September 2010 for failure to pay child support in four different cases. As of August 2011, Scarface was released from jail. In 2012, Scarface collaborated with Ice Cube on an Insane Clown Posse remix called "Chris Benoit" on The Mighty Death Pop!'s bonus album Mike E. Clark's Extra Pop Emporium.

Media appearances 
Scarface also appeared in the Mike Judge film Idiocracy as a pimp named Upgrayedd. Judge also used the Scarface track "No Tears" and Geto Boys tracks "Still" and "Damn It Feels Good to Be a Gangsta" in his 1999 film Office Space.

He has appeared in the two video games: Def Jam Vendetta and its sequel Def Jam: Fight For NY.

At the 2015 BET Hip Hop Awards, he received the I Am Hip Hop award.

Public service 
On June 10, 2019, Jordan launched his campaign to be elected as the Councilperson for District D of the Houston City Council when the current seat holder, Dwight Boykins, decided to run for mayor. He announced his candidacy a day after the death of his friend and bandmate Bushwick Bill. Jordan's campaign is defined by the vision of "putting the neighbor back in the hood," which is the motto of Positive Purpose Movement, an organization that he founded. The organization works with area schools to promote education and empowerment among children from underrepresented communities.

Jordan was quoted in The Washington Post stating that "Scarface is dead." Positioning himself as a viable candidate for City Council, he emphasized his desire to build a legacy of public service when he added, "I'm not going to be a 75-year-old rapper... I'm going to be finishing my last term in office as president when I'm 75". Jordan was defeated by former educator Carolyn Evans-Shabazz in a run-off election on December 15, 2019.

Personal life 
Scarface claims to be a cousin of singer Johnny Nash.
He also owns and collects Gibson Les Paul electric guitars.

In March 2020, Scarface revealed that he had tested positive for COVID-19.

Bibliography 
Scarface released a memoir on April 21, 2015, which details various moments from his childhood, getting his first record deal from Rap-A-Lot, and his tenure at Def Jam South.

 Diary of a Madman (2015)

Discography

Studio albums
Mr. Scarface Is Back (1991)
The World Is Yours (1993)
The Diary (1994)
The Untouchable (1997)
My Homies (1998) 
The Last of a Dying Breed (2000)
The Fix (2002)
My Homies Part 2 (2006)
Made (2007)
Emeritus (2008)
Deeply Rooted (2015)

Collaboration albums
The Other Side of the Law with Facemob (1996)
One Hunid with The Product (2006)

Compilation albums
Deeply Rooted: The Lost Files (2017)

References

External links

Scarface's official website
Scarface interview at Complex.com

1970 births
Living people
African-American male rappers
African-American Muslims
Asylum Records artists
Def Jam Recordings artists
MNRK Music Group artists
Converts to Islam from Christianity
Rappers from Houston
Southern hip hop musicians
Gangsta rappers
21st-century American rappers
21st-century American male musicians
21st-century African-American musicians
20th-century African-American people